Swadesh News is a Hindi-language 24/7 news television channel, owned by Sri Sai Media Pvt. Ltd.

References

Hindi-language television channels in India
Television channels and stations established in 2015
Hindi-language television stations
Television stations in New Delhi
2015 establishments in Delhi